Marcelo Apovian (born 21 December 1972) is a Brazilian alpine skier. He competed at the 1992 Winter Olympics and the 1998 Winter Olympics.

References

External links
 

1972 births
Living people
Brazilian male alpine skiers
Olympic alpine skiers of Brazil
Alpine skiers at the 1992 Winter Olympics
Alpine skiers at the 1998 Winter Olympics
Place of birth missing (living people)